William Pelham may refer to:

 William Pelham (lord justice) (died 1587)
 William Pelham (bookseller) (1759-1827)
 William Pelham (Medal of Honor recipient), American Civil War sailor
 William E. Pelham, American clinical psychologist